Alsek Peak is a mountain summit located in the Saint Elias Mountains of Yukon, Canada.

References

External links

Two-thousanders of Yukon
Saint Elias Mountains